Seveso railway station is a railway station in Italy. It is located on the Milan–Asso railway and is the origin of the branch to Camnago. It serves the town of Seveso.

Services
Seveso is served by lines S2 and S4 of the Milan suburban railway network, and by the Milan–Asso regional line. All of them are operated by the Lombard railway company Trenord.

See also
 Milan suburban railway network

References

External links
 
 Ferrovienord official site - Seveso railway station 

Railway stations in Lombardy
Ferrovienord stations
Railway stations opened in 1879
Milan S Lines stations